Claudio de Sousa (born 10 August 1985) is an Italian footballer who currently plays as a forward for Ostia Mare.

Career
Born in Rome to Angolan father and Italian mother, De Sousa made his Serie A debut with Lazio in 2005 and was then signed by Messina. Later that year, he was sold to Torino in co-ownership deal. He then spent time on loan at Catanzaro and then left for Ancona.

After an unsuccessful short stint at Pescara, De Sousa was released from his contract in July 2009.

In January 2011, De Sousa moved to San Marino, where he signed for Murata. His career was rejuvenated there and scored a total 19 goals in 28 games for the club. In July 2012, he joined Lega Pro Seconda Divisione club Chieti after a trial period.

L'Aquila and Como
In summer 2013 he was signed by L'Aquila. On 31 August 2014 he was signed by Como in a temporary deal. The following year returns to play in the L'Aquila.

Racing Club Roma 
Since the summer of 2016 playing for Racing Club Roma.

Racing Aprilia
On 27 December 2018, de Sousa signed with Aprilia.

Ostia Mare
De Sousa joined Serie D club Ostia Mare ahead of the 2019/20 season. The deal was confirmed on 29 June 2019.

References

External links

 

1985 births
Living people
Footballers from Rome
Italian footballers
Association football forwards
Serie A players
Serie B players
Serie C players
S.S. Lazio players
Torino F.C. players
U.S. Catanzaro 1929 players
A.C. Ancona players
Delfino Pescara 1936 players
S.S. Murata players
S.S. Chieti Calcio players
L'Aquila Calcio 1927 players
Como 1907 players
U.S. Viterbese 1908 players
F.C. Aprilia Racing Club players
A.S. Ostia Mare Lido Calcio players